The Breda 20/65 mod.35 ("Breda 20 mm L/65 model 1935"), also simply known as 20 mm Breda or Breda Model 35, among other variations, was an Italian  anti-aircraft gun produced by the Società Italiana Ernesto Breda of Brescia company during the 1930s and early 1940s which saw heavy usage during the Spanish Civil War and World War II, among other period conflicts. It was designed in 1932 and adopted by the Italian armed forces in 1935, becoming one of two major 20 mm caliber anti-aircraft guns used by Italy during World War II, the other being the Scotti-Isotta Fraschini 20/70 (Scotti 20 mm), both firing the common Swiss 20x138mmB "Solothurn Long" cartridge.

The Royal Italian Army formally designated the gun Cannone-Mitragliera da 20/65 ( "Cannon-Machinegun 20/65"), with the mount being designated modello 35 (model 1935), or mod.35 for short. Later, a mod.39 (1939) and a mod.40 (1940) system were introduced, featuring the same gun but in new mounts. The "20/65" part of the name refers to the caliber and barrel length of the gun (20 mm L/65).

Design 
Designed as a dual purpose weapon for use against both aircraft and ground targets, it was effective against light tanks, with the armour-piercing round being able to penetrate 30 millimeters of armour at a range of 500 meters. It had a two-wheeled trailer, but due to its structural weakness that limited the towing speed to 20 km/h, the weapon was usually transported on a truck bed instead.

Naval version 
This gun was widely employed by the Regia Marina as a deck-mounted anti-aircraft weapon in most Italian warships, in both single and twin mountings; considered a fairly efficient weapon, in the widespread Model 1935 twin mounting, it shared with the similar Cannone-Mitragliera da 37/54 the operating systems and therefore its flaws, namely high vibrations and the requirement for a strong supporting structure. Of the two single mountings (Model 1939 and 1940), the latter (widely used on small units like corvettes, and MAS), partly corrected these faults and had a better sight; however, overall the Breda 20 mm was considered somewhat inferior to the Oerlikon 20 mm cannon (used by the Regia Marina from 1941). All the mountings had an elevation of −10 to +90 degrees. The 1935 twin mounting fitted the guns next to each other with the left gun (in direction of aim) placed on a level above the right gun so as to clear the horizontal ammunition feeding port.

In 1940 the Swedish Navy received a number of Breda 20/65 naval guns as part of their purchase of two Spica-class torpedo boats, in Sweden becoming HSwMS Romulus (27) & HSwMS Remus (28) in the "Romulus-class". In Swedish service the guns were designated '20 mm automatkanon m/38' (20 mm autocannon m/38), or '20 mm akan m/38' for short. The guns primarily used the Italian naval twin-mount and shared ammunition commonality with the Swedish army's '20 mm akan m/39' (2 cm Flak 30) anti air guns purchased around the same time.

Use 
In addition to use as an anti-aircraft gun, the Model 35 was mounted as the main armament in several vehicles.  It was initially fitted in four Panzer Is converted during the Spanish Civil War, by the Nationalists, in an effort to improve their fighting capability against the Soviet T-26s fielded by the Republican forces. Later the gun was fitted to Fiat L6/40 light tanks and the AB 41 armoured cars.

After the Winter War had begun, Finland bought 88 Breda guns from Italy, the last arriving during the Interim Peace in June 1940. Five of the Finnish Bredas were lost in action during the Continuation War. In addition, the four Italian-built Jymy class motor torpedo boats operated by the Finnish Navy each had one 20 mm Breda cannon on the rear deck. The Finnish Defence Forces used the 20 ItK/35 Breda, as the gun was officially known in that service, as a training weapon for anti-aircraft crews for several decades after the end of World War II. In 1985 there were still 76 guns remaining in the inventory, but all of these were discarded later during that decade.

In North Africa, the Commonwealth forces captured many Breda Model 35s during Operation Compass, enabling the Australian 2/3 Light Anti-Aircraft Regiment, parts of the 4th Anti-Aircraft Brigade (which had a total of 42 Bredas in its Light Anti-Aircraft batteries during the Siege of Tobruk) and one battery of 106th (Lancashire Hussars) Regiment, RHA to be equipped with them.

Captured Bredas were used by the Long Range Desert Group and Royal Australian Navy and Royal Navy vessels including HMAS Vendetta, HMAS Perth and HMS Ladybird, and at least one Marmon-Herrington Mk II armoured car.

During the Second Sino-Japanese War (World War 2 in China), Chinese Nationalist Army soldiers used the Breda Model 35 during the Battle of Xinkou, shooting down 3 Japanese planes. The Breda Model 35 was not only used in the anti-aircraft role but was also used to destroy Japanese tanks and armored vehicles.

Ecuadorian Army bought some Breda guns before the Ecuadorian–Peruvian War but lost 9 of them during the war.

Kingdom of Yugoslavia bought 120 Breda guns in 1939 and they were delivered before invasion of Yugoslavia

Users 

 – designation: 20 ItK/35, Breda

 - designation: 2 cm Breda (i)
 (among various other warring Chinese military factions – see Chinese Civil War)

 - designation: 20 mm akan m/38

See also 
Cannone-Mitragliera da 20/77 (Scotti)

References

Notes

Bibliography 
 
 
 Pitkänen, Mika & Simpanen, Timo. 20 mm Suomessa – Aseet ja ampumatarvikkeet ennen vuotta 1945  20 mm in Finland – Weapons and Ammunition prior to 1945. Apali, 2007. 
 Latimer, Jon. Operation Compass 1940: Wavell's whirlwind offensive. Praeger, 2004. 
 Latimer, Jon. Tobruk 1941: Rommel's opening move. Praeger, 2004. 
 https://web.archive.org/web/20071117013208/http://www.italie1935-45.com/RE/photoscopes/photoscopebreda20-65.html

External links 

Anti-aircraft guns of Italy
World War II anti-aircraft guns
20 mm artillery
World War II artillery of Italy
Breda weapons
Military equipment introduced in the 1930s